The Pandav Falls is a waterfall in the Panna district in the Indian state of Madhya Pradesh.

The falls are named after the legendary Pandava brothers of the epic poem Mahabharata, who supposedly visited this area. Remains of caves and shrines that commemorate this legend can be seen around the pool below.

References
 

Waterfalls of Madhya Pradesh
Tourist attractions in Panna district